The Morane-Saulnier MS.224 was a prototype fighter plane built by Morane-Saulnier in the early 1930s.

Design
The MS.224 was a high-wing monoplane based on the Morane-Saulnier MS.223, being made from wood and metal. It differed from the MS.223 in having a larger wing and Gnome-Rhône 9Asb engine. The MS.224 flew in 1931 and showed an improvement in top speed over that of the MS.223 despite an increase in weight. Although the MS.224 wasn't ordered into production, it paved way for the development of the Morane-Saulnier M.S.225.

Specifications (MS.224)

References

Further reading

1930s French fighter aircraft
High-wing aircraft
MS.224
Single-engined tractor aircraft